Upper Lawrencetown is a Canadian rural community in Nova Scotia, Canada within the Halifax Regional Municipality.

It is located on the Eastern Shore along Route 207, also known as the Marine Drive.

Schools
Atlantic View Elementary School (pr to 6)

References
Explore HRM

Communities in Halifax, Nova Scotia
General Service Areas in Nova Scotia